Kočani Delikates is a defunct basketball club based in Kočani, North Macedonia. They played in the Macedonian First League until the season 1997/1998.

Domestic Achievements

 Macedonian Basketball Cup Winners - 1995

Notable former players

 Sašo Lazarov
 Gjorgji Knjazev
 Goran Dimitrijević
 Georgi Bujukliev
 Goce Andrevski
 Boris Nešović
 Vojislav Zivčević
 Michael Ingram
 Terrel Castle
 Bonner Upshaw
 Lafester Rhodes
 Joseph Marion
 Greg Anthony Grant
  Darko Knežević

References

External links
 

Basketball teams in North Macedonia